This is a list of airports in Ethiopia, grouped by type and sorted by location.

Transport in Ethiopia is overseen by the Ministry of Transport and Communications.

Airports 
Airport names shown in bold indicate the airport has scheduled service on commercial airlines.

See also 
 Transport in Ethiopia
 Ethiopian Air Force
 List of airports by ICAO code: H#HA - Ethiopia
 Wikipedia: WikiProject Aviation/Airline destination lists: Africa#Ethiopia

References 
 
  - includes IATA codes
 Great Circle Mapper: Airports in Ethiopia - IATA and ICAO codes
 World Aero Data: Airports in Ethiopia - ICAO codes

Notes

 
Airports
Ethiopia
Airports
Ethiopia